Werner Müller (born 7 September 1922) is a Swiss sprint canoer who competed in the early 1950s. He finished 16th in the K-2 10000 m event at the 1952 Summer Olympics in Helsinki.

References
Werner Müller's profile at Sports Reference.com

External links
 

1922 births
Possibly living people
Canoeists at the 1952 Summer Olympics
Olympic canoeists of Switzerland
Swiss male canoeists